Elysia obtusa is a species of sea slug, a marine gastropod mollusc in the family Plakobranchidae. This sea slug resembles a nudibranch but is not closely related to that order of gastropods, instead it is a sacoglossan.

Description
It is a translucent golden green colour, sparsely covered with white spots. The broad parapodia are distinctively rimmed with white. They are sometimes a much darker shade of green than the rest of the body but that is believed to be when the animal has recently fed and the pigment of the chlorophyll shows through.

Distribution

References

Plakobranchidae
Gastropods described in 1938